The Church of St. George is a Christian Orthodox Church in the village of Tromegje in Kumanovo Municipality, North Macedonia.

See also
Kumanovo

References

Kumanovo Municipality
Macedonian Orthodox churches
Eastern Orthodox church buildings in North Macedonia